Lake Forest Country Day School (LFCDS), founded in 1888, is a coeducational, independent preK-8 school located on a 29-acre campus in Lake Forest, Illinois, USA, a suburb approximately 30 miles north of Chicago. The School serves families from more than 34 communities. The School is affiliated with the Country Day School movement and is a member of The National Association of Independent Schools, The Independent Schools Association of the Central States, The Lake Michigan Association of Independent Schools and The Secondary School Admission Testing Board.

The school has a House System. The system does not, however, have any disciplinary aims or purpose. The houses are named after the school's four most prominent founders. They are the Alcott House, whose house color is purple, the Bell House, whose color is yellow, the Farwell house, whose color is blue, and the Mason house, whose color is red. The system is to bring a cross-grade feeling of unity throughout the school. The students all have buddies, all of which have a fairly wide age difference.

External links
Lake Forest Country Day School website

Private elementary schools in Illinois
Private middle schools in Illinois
Educational institutions established in 1888
Lake Forest, Illinois
Schools in Lake County, Illinois
1888 establishments in Illinois